William Stolte Sr. House is a historic late 19th-century house located at 432 South Walnut Street, next to William Stolte Jr. House in Reedsburg, Wisconsin. It was added to the National Register of Historic Places on December 26, 1984.

It is a two-story frame house.  It is designed in a Victorian Gothic/Queen Anne style "with a hip and gable roof and scroll-like modillions ornamenting the cornice."

Its back yard, which goes down to the Baraboo River, includes a frame smokehouse and a hitching post with "Stolte" inscribed upon it.

References

Houses in Sauk County, Wisconsin
Houses on the National Register of Historic Places in Wisconsin
National Register of Historic Places in Sauk County, Wisconsin
Reedsburg, Wisconsin
Queen Anne architecture in Wisconsin